The 2014 Japanese motorcycle Grand Prix was the fifteenth round of the 2014 Grand Prix motorcycle racing season. It was held at the Twin Ring Motegi in Motegi on 12 October 2014.

In the MotoGP class, Andrea Dovizioso took his first pole position since the 2010 Japanese Grand Prix. However, Jorge Lorenzo won his second successive race, but a second-place finish for Marc Márquez was good enough for his second consecutive premier class world championship, and his fourth world title in total. The podium placings were completed by Valentino Rossi, who finished in third place. In the supporting categories, Thomas Lüthi took his first victory since  by winning the Moto2 race, while in the Moto3 race, Álex Márquez took advantage of a collision between Ajo Motorsport teammates Jack Miller and Danny Kent, to take his third victory of 2014.

Classification

MotoGP

Moto2

Moto3

Championship standings after the race (MotoGP)
Below are the standings for the top five riders and constructors after round fifteen has concluded.

Riders' Championship standings

Constructors' Championship standings

 Note: Only the top five positions are included for both sets of standings.

References

2014 MotoGP race reports
Japanese Motorcycle Grand Prix
Japanese motorcycle Grand Prix
Japanese motorcycle Grand Prix